Beatová síň slávy (Czech for Beat Hall of Fame or simply BSS) is a listing of people who have significantly contributed to Czech (or Czechoslovak) rock music. Nominations are made in three categories: musician, dead musician, and band. Each year's selections are voted on by listeners of Radio Beat station.

Inductees

References 

Czech music awards